Martyr is a surname. Notable people with this surname include:

 Grace Ethel Martyr (1888–1934), Australian poet, short story writer and journalist
 John Martyr (1932–2021), Australian politician
 Weston Martyr (1885–1966), pioneer British ocean yachtsman, writer and broadcaster

See also 

 Martyr (disambiguation)